The Perkinsville Bridge over the Verde River was established in 1936 when it was moved from the San Carlos Indian Reservation over the Gila River.  The current structure was constructed from spans of the San Carlos Bridge which was built in 1913 and then rebuilt in 1921 after damage due to flooding.  It was listed on the National Register of Historic Places in 1989.

See also
 Verde River Bridge, also NRHP-listed
 Verde River Sheep Bridge, also NRHP-listed

References

External links

Road bridges on the National Register of Historic Places in Arizona
Bridges completed in 1921
Buildings and structures in Yavapai County, Arizona
1921 establishments in Arizona
National Register of Historic Places in Yavapai County, Arizona
Relocated buildings and structures in Arizona
Steel bridges in the United States